Filip Valenčič (born 7 January 1992) is a Slovenian footballer who plays as a midfielder for ÍBV.

Club career 
Valenčič started his senior career with local side Interblock, before moving to Slovenian PrvaLiga side Olimpija Ljubljana in 2011.

In July 2015, he signed with English side Notts County. He scored his first goal for the club against Crawley Town in a 1–0 win in January 2016.

Following his short spell in England, he signed with Palloseura Kemi Kings ahead of their first season in the Veikkausliiga, the top flight of Finnish football. In 2017, he moved to HJK. In his first campaign with HJK, he finished as the league's joint second top-scorer with 15 goals (7 after his move from PS Kemi), and helped his team winning their record 28th league title. He also went on to win the league's player of the season award at the league's end of year gala on 3 November 2017.

After two successful seasons with HJK, Valenčič signed a deal with Stabæk in 2018 on a three-year contract. He would go on to only play 124 minutes during the 2018 Eliteserien campaign, scoring no goals. On 12 February 2019, he joined Inter Turku on loan for the 2019 Veikkausliiga season. He finished the campaign as the league's top scorer with 16 goals as the club finished in second place, securing a spot in the first qualifying round of the 2020–21 UEFA Europa League.

In June 2022, Valenčič signed for KuPS.

International career 
Valenčič has represented Slovenia at various youth levels. In 2019, it was reported that he has considering switching allegiances and taking Finnish citizenship so that he could represent Finland on the international stage.

Honours 
HJK
 Veikkausliiga: 2017, 2018, 2021
 Finnish Cup: 2016–17

Individual
 Veikkausliiga Player of the Season: 2017, 2019
 Veikkausliiga Team of the Year: 2017, 2019
 Veikkausliiga Best Forward: 2019
 Veikkausliiga Top Goalscorer: 2019
 Finnish Cup Top Goalscorer: 2017–18

References

External links

Player profile at NZS 

1992 births
Living people
Footballers from Ljubljana
Slovenian footballers
Slovenia youth international footballers
Slovenia under-21 international footballers
Association football midfielders
NK IB 1975 Ljubljana players
NK Olimpija Ljubljana (2005) players
A.C. Monza players
Notts County F.C. players
Kemi City F.C. players
Helsingin Jalkapalloklubi players
Stabæk Fotball players
FC Inter Turku players
FC Dinamo Minsk players
Kuopion Palloseura players
Íþróttabandalag Vestmannaeyja players
Slovenian PrvaLiga players
Slovenian Second League players
Serie C players
English Football League players
Veikkausliiga players
Eliteserien players
Belarusian Premier League players
Kakkonen players
Slovenian expatriate footballers
Expatriate footballers in Italy
Slovenian expatriate sportspeople in Italy
Expatriate footballers in England
Slovenian expatriate sportspeople in England
Expatriate footballers in Finland
Slovenian expatriate sportspeople in Finland
Expatriate footballers in Norway
Slovenian expatriate sportspeople in Norway
Expatriate footballers in Belarus
Slovenian expatriate sportspeople in Belarus
Expatriate footballers in Iceland
Slovenian expatriate sportspeople in Iceland